Catocala danilovi is a moth in the family Erebidae first described by Otto Bang-Haas in 1927. It is found in south-eastern Siberia.

References

danilovi
Moths described in 1927
Moths of Asia